Curături may refer to several villages in Romania:

 Curături, a village in Roşia Montană Commune, Alba County
 Curături, a village in Ciurea Commune, Iaşi County